S3 Group is a technology company that has provided software products to operators, OEM's, semiconductors and healthcare providers. Founded in 1986 as Silicon & Software Systems (S3), S3 Group has a history in systems, embedded software and silicon design for consumer, wireless, WiMAX and related applications.

In 2015, the group's "S3 TV Technology" business unit was sold to Accenture, and in 2018, the "S3 Semiconductors" division sold to Adesto Technologies. The remaining "S3 Connected Health" unit had, as of 2018, approximately 200 employees.

References

External links 
 

Companies based in Dublin (city)